Eucavitaves is a clade that contains the order Trogoniformes (trogons) and the clade Picocoraciae (a large assemblage of birds that includes woodpeckers, kingfishers, hornbills and hoopoes). The name refers to the fact that the majority of them nest in cavities.

Cladogram of Eucavitaves relationships based on Jarvis, E.D. et al. (2014) with some clade names after  Yuri, T. et al. (2013) and Kimball 2013.

References

Neognathae